EFAO Zografou B.C. (Greek: ΕΦΑΟ Ζωγράφου K.A.E.), abbreviated as EFAOZ B.C. (ΕΦΑΟΖ K.A.E.), is a Greek professional basketball club based in Zografou, Athens. The club's full name is Enosi Filathlitikou Athlitikou Omilou Zografou (Ένωση Φιλαθλητικού Αθλητικού Ομίλου Ζωγράφου), which means Union of Philathletic Athletic Group of Zografou. The club is also commonly known as Filathlitikos B.C. The team's colors are red and white.

The club is mostly known for being the first club that Giannis Antetokounmpo played for, prior to his being selected in the 2013 NBA draft, and playing in the National Basketball Association (NBA), as well as for being the club that the eldest Antetokounmpo brothers (Thanasis, and Giannis), played with. The youngest Antetokounmpo brothers, Kostas and Alex, also played with the club's youth teams.

Logos

History
In 1954, the basketball section of Omilos Athlitikos Zografou (Ομίλου Αθλητικού Ζωγράφου), or O.A. Zografou, was created. Filathlitikos Athlitikos Omilos Zografou B.C. (Φιλαθλητικός Αθλητικός Όμιλος Ζωγράφου K.A.E.), or Filathlitikos A.O. Zografou (FAOZ), was founded in 1986. Filathlitikos competed in the second tier level of Greek basketball, the Greek A2 Basket League, for the first time, during the 2012–13 season. During that season, Filathlitikos featured players like the Antetokounmpo brothers, Giannis and Thanasis, as well as players like Nikos Gkikas, Michalis Kamperidis, and Christos Saloustros, guided by head coach Takis Zivas. They finished in third place in the A2 League that season.

During the 2013–14 season, Filathlitikos finished in twelfth place in the league, and they were relegated back down to the third tier level of Greek basketball, the Greek B Basket League. In 2016, Filathlitikos merged with O.A. Zografou (Ο.A. Ζωγράφου), to form the newly named club of Filathlitikos Omilos Athlitikos Zografou (Φιλαθλητικός Όμιλος Αθλητικός Ζωγράφου), abbreviated as FOAZ (ΦΟΑΖ). In 2018, the club changed its name to Enosi Filathlitikos Athlitikos Omilos Zografou (Ένωση Φιλαθλητικού Αθλητικού Ομίλου Ζωγράφου), abbreviated as EFAOZ (ΕΦΑΟΖ), and meaning Union of Philathletic Athletic Group of Zografou.

Arena
EFAO Zografou plays its home games at the Zografou AntetokounBros Municipal Gymnasium, which is located in Zografou, a suburb of Athens. In 2019, the arena was named after the Antetokounmpo brothers (Francis, Thanasis, Giannis, Kostas, and Alex), all of whom played with the club at various times, whether in the senior men's team, or in the club's youth teams.

Season-by-season

Notable players

Senior club players
  Giannis Antetokounmpo
  Thanasis Antetokounmpo
  Nikos Gkikas
  Michalis Kamperidis
  Spyros Magkounis
  Christos Saloustros

Junior club players
  Alex Antetokounmpo
  Kostas Antetokounmpo

Head coaches
  Takis Zivas

References

External links
Official website 
Eurobasket.com EFAO Zografou Team Profile
Eurobasket.com Filathlitikos AO Team Profile

 
Basketball teams in Greece
Basketball teams established in 1986